Palannoruwa Central College is a school in Gonapola, Western Province, Sri Lanka.

References

External links
 school website

Schools in Kalutara District